The Falkland Islands general election of 1964 was held on 16 and 17 March 1964 to elect members to the Legislative Council. Four out of the ten Councillors were elected through universal suffrage, two from Stanley and one each from East Falkland and West Falkland. It was the first election in the Falklands after the number of Councillors was reduced from twelve to ten, with the abolition two appointed members of the Council. Marjorie Vinson became the first woman to be elected to the Council, winning the seat of East Falkland.

Results
Candidates in bold were elected.  Candidates in italic were incumbents.

Stanley constituency

East Falkland constituency

West Falkland constituency

References

1964 elections in South America
General election
1964
Non-partisan elections
March 1964 events in South America
1964 elections in the British Empire